Violet Barungi (born 18 December 1943) is a Ugandan writer and editor. She has edited several publications published by FEMRITE. Her published books include the novel Cassandra. She has worked as a book Production Officer at the East African Literature Bureau (1972–77), senior Book Production Officer at Uganda Literature Bureau (1978–94) and an editor at FEMRITE (1997 to date).

Early life and education
Violet Barungi was born in Mbarara District, now Ibanda District, Western Uganda. She was educated at Bweranyangi Girls' Senior Secondary School, Gayaza High School and Makerere University in Kampala, where she graduated with an honours degree in History. She is married and has six children.

Writing
Violet Barungi started writing while she was still a student. Her first short story, "Kefa Kazana", was published in Origin East Africa, an anthology of short stories edited by Prof. David Cook and broadcast on the BBC in 1964. Barungi’s play Over My Dead Body won the British Council New Playwriting Award for Africa and The Middle East in 1997, and has been subsequently anthologized in African Women Playwrights, edited by Professor Kathy Perkins, an authority on African and African Diaspora theatre.

Her publications include The Shadow and the Substance (novel) published by Lake Publishers, Kenya, 1998, Cassandra (novel) published by FEMRITE Publications Limited, Uganda, 1999, short stories for children, which include Tit for Tat and other stories (1997), The Promise (2002), Our Cousins From Abroad (2003) and The Boy Who Became King (2004). Her play Over My Dead Body (unpublished) won the British Council International New Playwriting Award for Africa and the Middle East region, 1997. Her other plays include The Award-winner, a stage play written to commemorate women’s creative works in the new millennium (unpublished) and an unpublished radio play, The Bleeding Heart. 
 
Violet Barungi’s works deal mainly with human relationships, gender issues and education of the girl child. Over My Dead Body was inspired by her deep concern for girls who are lured into early marriages to rich men before they finish their education. When things go wrong, and their marriages fail, they find themselves without anything to fall back on.”

Editing
Baungi is one of the founding members of FEMRITE. She was an editor for FEMRITE from 1997 until 2007, when she retired. She has on a number of occasions been co-editor for books published by FEMRITE, since her semi-retirement.

Bibliography

Novels

Children's books

 with Rose Rwakasisi
 with Rose Rwakasisi

Short stories
"Impenetrable Barriers" in 
"Afraid of my love" in 
"Jago Goes to School" in Children Read Everywhere, an anthology of short stories for children edited by Betten and Resch 2002 and published in Germany, 2003.
 "The Last One to Know ", in

Plays
"Over My Dead Body" in 
The Bleeding Heart (radio play)
The Award-Winner, 2000

Edited works

Awards and recognition
Won the British Council New Playwriting Award for Africa and The Middle East in 1997 for "Over My Dead Body".

References

Ugandan novelists
Ugandan women writers
Makerere University alumni
Living people
Ugandan women novelists
Kumusha
1943 births
Ugandan children's writers
Ugandan women children's writers
Ugandan dramatists and playwrights
Ugandan women short story writers
Ugandan short story writers
Women dramatists and playwrights
20th-century novelists
21st-century novelists
20th-century short story writers
21st-century short story writers
20th-century dramatists and playwrights
21st-century dramatists and playwrights
20th-century Ugandan women writers
21st-century Ugandan women writers
People from Ibanda District
People educated at Bweranyangi Girls' Senior Secondary School
People educated at Gayaza High School